Romulus was the legendary founder and first king of Rome. Various traditions attribute the establishment of many of Rome's oldest legal, political, religious, and social institutions to Romulus and his contemporaries. Although many of these traditions incorporate elements of folklore, and it is not clear to what extent a historical figure underlies the God-like Romulus, the events and institutions ascribed to him were central to the myths surrounding Rome's origins and cultural traditions.

Traditional account
The myths concerning Romulus involve several distinct episodes and figures, including the miraculous birth and youth of Romulus and his twin brother, Remus; Remus' murder and the founding of Rome; the Rape of the Sabine Women, and the subsequent war with the Sabines; a period of joint rule with Titus Tatius; the establishment of various Roman institutions; the death or apotheosis of Romulus, and the succession of Numa Pompilius.

Romulus and Remus

According to Roman polytheism, Romulus and Remus were the sons of Rhea Silvia by the god Mars.  Their maternal grandfather was Numitor, the rightful king of Alba Longa, through whom the twins were descended from both the Trojan hero Aeneas, and Latinus, the king of Latium.

Before the twins' birth, Numitor's throne had been usurped by his brother, Amulius, who murdered Numitor's son or sons, and condemned Rhea Silvia to perpetual virginity by consecrating her a Vestal. When Rhea became pregnant, she asserted that she had been visited by the god Mars. Amulius imprisoned her, and upon the twins' birth, ordered that they be thrown into the Tiber. But as the river had been swollen by rain, the servants tasked with disposing of the infants could not reach its banks, and so exposed the twins beneath a fig tree at the foot of the Palatine Hill.

In the traditional account, a she-wolf happened upon the twins, and suckled them until they were found by the king's herdsman, Faustulus, and his wife, Acca Larentia. The brothers grew to manhood among the shepherds and hill-folk.  After becoming involved in a conflict between the followers of Amulius and those of their grandfather Numitor, Faustulus told them of their origin. With the help of their friends, they lured Amulius into an ambush and killed him, restoring their grandfather to the throne. The princes then set out to establish a city of their own.

They returned to the hills overlooking the Tiber, the site where they had been exposed as infants. They could not agree on which hill should house the new city. When an omen to resolve the controversy failed to provide a clear indication, the conflict escalated and Romulus or one of his followers killed Remus. In a variant of the legend, the augurs favoured Romulus, who proceeded to plough a square furrow around the Palatine Hill to demarcate the walls of the future city. When Remus derisively leapt over the "walls" to show how inadequate they were against invaders, Romulus struck him down in anger. In another variant, Remus was killed during a melée, along with Faustulus.

Establishment of the city
The founding of Rome was commemorated annually on April 21, with the festival of the Parilia. Romulus' first act was to fortify the Palatine, in the course of which he made a sacrifice to the gods. He laid out the city's boundaries with a furrow that he ploughed, performed another sacrifice, and with his followers set to work building the city itself. Romulus sought the assent of the people to become their king. With Numitor's help, he addressed them and received their approval. Romulus accepted the crown after he sacrificed and prayed to Jupiter, and after receiving favourable omens.

Romulus divided the populace into three tribes, known as the Ramnes, Titienses, and Luceres, for taxation and military purposes. Each tribe was presided over by an official known as a tribune, and was further divided into ten curia, or wards, each presided over by an official known as a curio. Romulus also allotted a portion of land to each ward, for the benefit of the people. Nothing is known of the manner in which the tribes and curiae were taxed, but for the military levy, each curia was responsible for providing one hundred foot soldiers, a unit known as a century, and ten cavalry. Each Romulean tribe thus provided about one thousand infantry, and one century of cavalry; the three hundred cavalry became known as the Celeres, "the swift", and formed the royal bodyguard.

Choosing one hundred men from the leading families, Romulus established the Roman senate. These men he called patres, the city fathers; their descendants came to be known as "patricians", forming one of the two major social classes at Rome. The other class, known as the "plebs" or "plebeians", consisted of the servants, freedmen, fugitives who sought asylum at Rome, those captured in war, and others who were granted Roman citizenship over time.

To encourage the growth of the city, Romulus outlawed infanticide, and established an asylum for fugitives on the Capitoline Hill. Here freemen and slaves alike could claim protection and seek Roman citizenship.

The Rape of the Sabine Women

The new city was filled with colonists, most of whom were young, unmarried men. While fugitives seeking asylum helped the population grow, single men greatly outnumbered women. With no intermarriage taking place between Rome and neighboring communities, the new city would eventually fail. Romulus sent envoys to neighboring towns, appealing to them to allow intermarriage with Roman citizens, but his overtures were rebuffed. Romulus formulated a plan to acquire women from other settlements. He announced a momentous festival and games, and invited the people of the neighboring cities to attend. Many did, in particular the Sabines, who came in droves. At a prearranged signal, the Romans began to snatch and carry off the marriageable women among their guests.

The aggrieved cities prepared for war with Rome, and might have defeated Romulus had they been fully united. But impatient with the preparations of the Sabines, the Latin towns of Caenina, Crustumerium, and Antemnae took action without their allies. Caenina was the first to attack; its army was swiftly put to flight, and the town taken. After personally defeating and slaying the prince of Caenina in single combat, Romulus stripped him of his armour, becoming the first to claim the spolia opima, and vowed a temple to Jupiter Feretrius. Antemnae and Crustumerium were conquered in turn. Some of their people, chiefly the families of the abducted women, were allowed to settle at Rome.
 
Following the defeat of the Latin towns, the Sabines, under the leadership of Titus Tatius, marshalled their forces and advanced upon Rome. They gained control of the citadel by bribing Tarpeia, the daughter of the Roman commander charged with its defense. Without the advantage of the citadel, the Romans were obliged to meet the Sabines on the battlefield. The Sabines advanced from the citadel, and fierce fighting ensued. The nearby Lacus Curtius is said to be named after Mettius Curtius, a Sabine warrior who plunged his horse into its muck to stymie his Roman pursuers as he retreated. At a critical juncture in the fighting, the Romans began to waver in the face of the Sabine advance. Romulus vowed a temple to Jupiter Stator, to keep his line from breaking. The bloodshed finally ended when the Sabine women interposed themselves between the two armies, pleading on the one hand with their fathers and brothers, and on the other with their husbands, to set aside their arms and come to terms. The leaders of each side met and made peace. They formed one community, to be jointly ruled by Romulus and Tatius.

Subsequent events
The two kings presided over the growing city of Rome for a number of years, before Tatius was slain in a riot at Lavinium, where he had gone to make a sacrifice. Shortly before, a group of envoys from Laurentum had complained of their treatment by Tatius' kinsmen, and he had decided the matter against the ambassadors. Romulus resisted calls to avenge the Sabine king's death, instead reaffirming the Roman alliance with Lavinium, and perhaps preventing his city from splintering along ethnic lines.

In the years following the death of Tatius, Romulus is said to have conquered the city of Fidenae, which, alarmed by the rising power of Rome, had begun raiding Roman territory. The Romans lured the Fidenates into an ambush, and routed their army; as they retreated into their city, the Romans followed before the gates could be shut, and captured the town. The Etruscan city of Veii, nine miles up the Tiber from Rome, also raided Roman territory, foreshadowing that city's role as the chief rival to Roman power over the next three centuries. Romulus defeated Veii's army, but found the city too well defended to besiege, and instead ravaged the countryside.

Death and succession
After a reign of thirty-seven years, Romulus is said to have disappeared in a whirlwind during a sudden and violent storm, as he was reviewing his troops on the Campus Martius. Livy says that Romulus was either murdered by the senators, torn apart out of jealousy, or was raised to heaven by Mars, god of war. Livy believes the last theory regarding the legendary king's death, as it allows the Romans to believe that the gods are on their side, a reason for them to continue expansion under Romulus' name. 

Romulus acquired a cult following, which later became assimilated with the cult of Quirinus, perhaps originally the indigenous god of the Sabine population. As the Sabines had not had a king of their own since the death of Titus Tatius, the next king of Rome, Numa Pompilius, was chosen from among the Sabines.

Primary sources
Livy, Dionysius, and Plutarch rely on Quintus Fabius Pictor as a source. Other significant sources include Ovid's Fasti, and Virgil's Aeneid. Greek historians had traditionally claimed that Rome was founded by Greeks, a claim dating back to the logographer Hellanicus of Lesbos of 5th-century BC, who named Aeneas as its founder. Roman historians connect Romulus to Aeneas by ancestry and mention a previous settlement on the Palatine Hill, sometimes attributing it to Evander and his Greek colonists. To the Romans, Rome was the institutions and traditions they credit to their legendary founder, the first "Roman".

The legend as a whole encapsulates Rome's ideas of itself, its origins and moral values. For modern scholarship, it remains one of the most complex and problematic of all foundation myths. Ancient historians had no doubt that Romulus gave his name to the city. Most modern historians believe his name is a back-formation from the name of the city. Roman historians dated the city's foundation to between 758 and 728 BC, and Plutarch reports the calculation of Varro's friend Tarutius that 771 BC was the birth year of Romulus and his twin. The tradition that gave Romulus a distant ancestor in the semi-divine Trojan prince Aeneas was further embellished, and Romulus was made the direct ancestor of Rome's first Imperial dynasty. It is unclear whether or not the tale of Romulus or that of the twins are original elements of the foundation myth, or whether both or either were added.

Romulus-Quirinus

Ennius (fl. 180s BC) refers to Romulus as a divinity in his own right, without reference to Quirinus. Roman mythographers identified the latter as an originally Sabine war-deity, and thus to be identified with Roman Mars. Lucilius lists Quirinus and Romulus as separate deities, and Varro accords them different temples. Images of Quirinus showed him as a bearded warrior wielding a spear as a god of war, the embodiment of Roman strength and a deified likeness of the city of Rome. He had a Flamen Maior called the Flamen Quirinalis, who oversaw his worship and rituals in the ordainment of Roman religion attributed to Romulus's royal successor, Numa Pompilius. There is however no evidence for the conflated Romulus-Quirinus before the 1st century BC.

Ovid in Metamorphoses XIV (lines 805-828) gives a description of the deification of Romulus and his wife Hersilia, who are given the new names of Quirinus and Hora respectively. Mars, the father of Romulus, is given permission by Jupiter to bring his son up to Olympus to live with the Olympians. 

One theory regarding this tradition proposes the emergence of two mythical figures from an earlier, singular hero. While Romulus is a founding hero, Quirinus may have been a god of the harvest, and the Fornacalia a festival celebrating a staple crop (spelt). Through the traditional dates from the tales and the festivals, they are each associated with one another. A legend of the murder of such a founding hero, the burying of the hero's body in the fields (found in some accounts), and a festival associated with that hero, a god of the harvest, and a food staple is a pattern recognized by anthropologists. Called a "dema archetype", this pattern suggests that in a prior tradition, the god and the hero were in fact the same figure and later evolved into two.

Historicity
Possible historical bases for the broad mythological narrative remain unclear and disputed.

Modern scholarship approaches the various known stories of the myth as cumulative elaborations and later interpretations of Roman foundation myth. Particular versions and collations were presented by Roman historians as authoritative, an official history trimmed of contradictions and untidy variants to justify contemporary developments, genealogies and actions in relation to Roman morality. Other narratives appear to represent popular or folkloric tradition; some of these remain inscrutable in purpose and meaning. T.P. Wiseman sums up the whole issue as the mythography of an unusually problematic foundation and early history.

The unsavoury elements of many of the myths concerning Romulus have led some scholars to describe them as "shameful" or "disreputable". In antiquity such stories became part of anti-Roman and anti-pagan propaganda. More recently, the historian Hermann Strasburger postulated that these were never part of authentic Roman tradition, but were invented and popularized by Rome's enemies, probably in Magna Graecia, during the latter part of the fourth century BC. This hypothesis is rejected by other scholars, such as Tim Cornell (1995), who notes that by this period, the story of Romulus and Remus had already assumed its standard form, and was widely accepted at Rome. Other elements of the Romulus mythos clearly resemble common elements of folk tale and legend, and thus strong evidence that the stories were both old and indigenous. Likewise, Momigliano finds Strasburger's argument well-developed, but entirely implausible; if the Romulus myths were an exercise in mockery, they were a signal failure.

Depictions in art
The episodes which make up the legend, most significantly that of the rape of the Sabine women, the tale of Tarpeia, and the death of Tatius have been a significant part of ancient Roman scholarship and the frequent subject of art, literature and philosophy since ancient times.

Palazzo Magnani
In the late 16th century, the wealthy Magnani family from Bologna commissioned a series of artworks based on the Roman foundation myth. The artists contributing works included a sculpture of Hercules with the infant twins by Gabriele Fiorini, featuring the patron's own face. The most important works were an elaborate series of frescoes collectively known as Histories of the Foundation of Rome by the Brothers Carracci: Ludovico, Annibale, and Agostino.

The rape of the Sabine women

Tarpeia

Hersilia

Death of Tatius
The subject for the 1788 Prix de Rome was the death of Tatius (La mort de Tatius). Garnier won the contest.

Death of Romulus

See also
Evander of Pallene
Hersilia
List of people who disappeared
Proculus Julius
Legendary progenitor

Notes

Citations

Bibliography

Cook, John Granger (2018), Empty Tomb, Apotheosis, Resurrection, p. 263.
Hyden, Marc (2020), Romulus: The Legend of Rome's Founding Father, Pen and Sword History, ISBN 9781526783172.

Ancient Sources 

Dionysius of Halicarnassus, Roman Antiquities i & ii.
Livy, History of Rome i–v.

Additional reading 

Carandini, Andrea (2011). Rome: Day One. Princeton, N.J: Princeton University Press. .
Forsythe, Gary (2005). A Critical History of Early Rome: From Prehistory to the First Punic War. Berkeley: University of California Press. .

8th-century BC Romans
8th-century BC monarchs
Kings of Rome
Deified Roman people
Founding monarchs
Missing person cases in Italy
People from Alba Longa
People whose existence is disputed
Romulus and Remus
Fratricides
Mythological city founders